Sally Wyatt (born 12 May 1959), is a researcher in Science and Technology Studies and the program Leader of the eHumanities group of the Royal Netherlands Academy of Arts and Sciences, director of The Netherlands Graduate Research School of Science, Technology and Modern Culture (WTMC) and professor of Digital Society Bachelor Course at Maastricht University.

Wyatt is known, among others, for her work on the non-users of technology, technological determinism, and the circulation of genetic data via the internet. As the internet became popularized in the late 1990s and early 2000s, the assumption was often made in popular media that everyone would ultimately embrace new technologies. Wyatt was the first to analyze the perspectives of non-users, meaning people who either purposefully avoided the internet or gave up using it after an initial period of use.

Wyatt was born in Canada. She holds a BA in Economics from McGill University (1979), a master in Economic Policy & Planning from Sussex University (1980) and a PhD from Maastricht University (1998) under Wiebe Bijker.

Before moving to the Netherlands she worked at the Science Policy Research Unit (SPRU) at Sussex University, the Economic and Social Research Council, Centre for Research into Innovation and Management at Brighton University and the department of Innovation Studies at University of East London.

Selected bibliography

Books

Chapters in books

Academic journals

References

External links 
 sallywyatt.nl

1959 births
Canadian sociologists
Living people
Academic staff of Maastricht University
Sociologists of science
Medical sociologists
Canadian women sociologists